Pandisc Records is an American independent record label founded in Miami, Florida, United States. Pandisc specializes in releasing Miami bass, electronic, and other bass and urban artists.  CDs produced by Beat Dominator and Bass Mekanik on the Pandisc label are widely used for car audio competitions.

In 1989, Pandisc released bluesman Joey Gilmore's debut album, So Good to be Bad

Artists
 Afro-Rican
 Bass Mekanik
 Blowfly
 DJ Baby Anne
 DJ Laz
 Maggotron
 Planet Detroit
 Trinere
 Joey Gilmore 
Debbie Deb
 Young and Restless
 MC Nas-D & DJ Freaky Fred
 Beat Dominator
 2 BMF
 Bad Ass Sound System (B.A.S.S.)
 Kinsu
 Clay D
 Crazy L'eggs
 Repo Crew
 The Puppies
 Bass Cube
 Splack Pack
 Eerk & Jerk
 Mental Block
 Funk'e Ray
The Mad Rapper

See also
 List of record labels

References

Official website
 Pandisc.com - official website

Electronic music record labels
American independent record labels
Companies based in Miami